Mago Hermano (Brother Wizard or Magician) is a 2003 bronze and steel sculpture by Mexico-born artist Alejandro Colunga, located in the lobby of Antoinette Hatfield Hall (part of Portland Center for the Performing Arts), at 1111 Southwest Broadway, in Portland, Oregon, United States.

Description and history
According to the Regional Arts & Culture Council, which administers the work, Mago Hermano is a gift from Fernando Garza Martinez as the mayor of Guadalajara to Vera Katz as the mayor of Portland, and the Portland-Guadalajara Sister City Association, to commemorate the twentieth anniversary of the sister cities. It is part of the City of Portland and Multnomah County Public Art Collection courtesy of the Regional Arts & Culture Council.

See also
 2003 in art

References

External links

 Mago Hermano (Brother Wizard or Magician) at the Public Art Archive
 Mago Hermano, A Sculpture by Alejandro Colunga: A Gift from the City of Guadalajara to the City of Portland, ARTnotes (June 2014)
 Alejandro Colunga's Mago Hermano sculpture finds new home in Portland: Sculpture to be unveiled during PGSCA Cinco de Mayo Fiesta represents Portland-Guadalajara sister city relationship, The Oregonian

2003 establishments in Oregon
2003 sculptures
Bronze sculptures in Oregon
Statues in Portland, Oregon
Steel sculptures in Oregon
Southwest Portland, Oregon